Landscape with Red Spots  was the name given to each of two successive oil paintings produced in Bavaria in 1913 by the Russian émigré painter Wassily Kandinsky. The first is now in the Museum Folkwang in Essen, Germany. The second, known as Landscape with Red Spots, No 2 (see picture at right), is in the Peggy Guggenheim Collection in Venice, Italy.

Between 1909 and the beginning of World War I, Kandinsky and his female companion, the painter Gabriele Münter, spent their summers  in Murnau am Staffelsee on the edge of the Bavarian Alps. The village church of St Nikolaus and its prominent round tower feature several times in landscape paintings executed by the artist during his time there. As Kandinsky's style evolved over the period into abstract expressionism the images of the church and its surroundings became gradually less figurative and more abstract.

Description

In both the pictures concerned here, which are very similar in composition but different in size, the church tower has been elongated as a geometrical shape to the very edge of the canvas and the mountains behind reduced to monochrome triangles. The eponymous red spots are at the foot of the tower.

The earlier work (see left) was acquired soon after completion by the poet Karl Wolfskehl, before being acquired by the Museum Folkwang in 1962.

See also
List of paintings by Wassily Kandinsky

References

External links 

1913 paintings
Paintings by Wassily Kandinsky
Peggy Guggenheim Collection
Abstract art